Baguashan Tunnel is a railway tunnel through Baguashan in Taiwan, located between Taichung HSR station and Changhua HSR station. With a route length of 7,357 meters, it is the longest tunnel on Taiwan High Speed Rail. Mileage of Baguashan Tunnel is TK173+021to TK180+378.

History
Apr 9, 2001 work begun.
Aug 29,2002 breakthrough.
Jan 5,2007 opened.

References

台灣高速鐵路全線隧道一覽表 - 悠遊台灣鐵道 

2007 establishments in Taiwan
Railway tunnels in Taiwan
Transportation in Changhua County
Taiwan High Speed Rail
Tunnels completed in 2007